The 2019 South American Under-15 Football Championship was the 9th edition of the South American Under-15 Football Championship, the biennial international youth football championship organised by the CONMEBOL for the men's under-15 national teams of South America. The tournament was originally to be held in Bolivia between 23 November and 8 December 2019. However, on 8 November 2019, CONMEBOL announced the tournament would be moved to Paraguay due to the 2019 Bolivian protests.

The defending champions are Argentina.

Teams
All ten CONMEBOL member national teams entered the tournament. Moreover, two teams from UEFA will be invited to compete.

Venues

Initially, Bolivia was designated as host of the tournament at the CONMEBOL Council meeting held on 14 August 2018 in Luque, Paraguay. Estadio Ramón Tahuichi Aguilera in Santa Cruz de la Sierra and Estadio Samuel Vaca Jiménez in Warnes had been chosen as the venues. However, due to the 2019 Bolivian protests, on 8 November 2019 CONMEBOL moved the tournament to Asunción, Paraguay.

The new venues were announced on 19 November 2019. Four stadiums in 3 cities were chosen, Cancha CONMEBOL and Estadio Adrián Jara in Luque, Estadio Arsenio Erico in Asunción and Estadio Luis Alfonso Giagni in Villa Elisa. The Estadio Defensores del Chaco was added as venue for the final matchday (third place match and final).

Squads

Draw
The draw of the tournament was held on 22 October 2019, 19:00 BOT (UTC−4), in Santa Cruz de la Sierra, Bolivia. The twelve involved teams were drawn into two groups of six. The original hosts Bolivia and the defending champions Argentina were seeded into Group A and Group B respectively and assigned to position 1 within their group, the remaining 8 CONMEBOL teams were placed into four "pairing pots" according to their final positions in the 2017 South American U-15 Championship (shown in brackets) and the two guests UEFA teams (Belgium and Poland) were placed in a last fifth pot.

The draw was led by Hugo Figueredo, competition director of CONMEBOL, who had the collaboration of Colombian coach Francisco Maturana and Juan Manuel Peña, former member of the Bolivia national football team.

Match officials
The referees and assistants referees were:

 Nicolás Lamolina
Assistants: Pablo González and Facundo Rodríguez
 Jordy Alemán
Assistants: Carlos Tapia and Rubén Flores
 Flavio Rodríguez De Souza
Assistants: Alessandro Rocha and Rafael Da Silva 
 Angelo Hermosilla
Assistants: José Retamal and Edson Cisternas
 Jhon Ospina
Assistants: Miguel Roldán and John Gallego

 Franklin Congo
Assistants: Juan Rafael Aguiar and Dennys Guerrero
 José Méndez
Assistants: Ródney Aquino and José Cuevas
 Kevin Ortega
Assistants: Raúl López and Stephen Atoche
 Andrés Matonte
Assistants: Santiago Fernández and Agustín Berisso
 Orlando Bracamonte
Assistants: José Ponte and Francheskoly Chacón

Support Referees

 Santiago Bismarks

 Augusto Aragón

Group stage
The top two teams of each group advance to the semi-finals.

All times are local, PYT (UTC−3).

As a result of the change of host, the matches of Paraguay will be played on the last turn of each matchday of group B.

Group A

Group B

Knockout stage
The Third place match and the Final were moved from Estadio Arsenio Erico to Estadio Defensores del Chaco.

Bracket

Semi-finals

Third place match

Final

Goalscorers

References

External links
Sudamericano Sub 15 Paraguay 2019, CONMEBOL.com

2019
International association football competitions hosted by Paraguay
Under-15 Football Championship
2019 in youth association football
South American Under-15 Football
South American Under-15 Football